The Qadiriyya are members of the Sunni Qadiri tariqa (Sufi order). The tariqa got its name from Abdul Qadir Gilani (1077–1166, also transliterated Jilani), who was a Hanbali scholar from Gilan, Iran. The order relies strongly upon adherence to the fundamentals of Sunni Islamic law.

The order, with its many offshoots, is widespread, particularly in the non-Arabic-speaking world, and can also be found in Turkey, Indonesia, Afghanistan, India, Bangladesh, Pakistan, the Balkans, Russia, Palestine, China, and East and West Africa.

History
The founder of the Qadiriyya, Abdul Qadir Gilani, was a scholar and preacher. Having been a pupil at the madrasa of Abu Sa'id al-Mubarak, he became the leader of this school after al-Mubarak's death in 1119. Being the new sheikh, he and his large family lived in the madrasa until his death in 1166, when his son, Abdul Razzaq, succeeded his father as sheikh. Abdul Razzaq published a hagiography of his father, emphasizing his reputation as founder of a distinct and prestigious Sufi order.

The Qadiriyya flourished, surviving the Mongolian conquest of Baghdad in 1258, and remained an influential Sunni institution. After the fall of the Abbasid Caliphate, the legend of Gilani was further spread by a text entitled The Joy of the Secrets in Abdul-Qadir's Mysterious Deeds (Bahjat al-asrar fi ba'd manaqib 'Abd al-Qadir) attributed to Nur al-Din 'Ali al-Shattanufi, who depicted Gilani as the ultimate channel of divine grace and helped the Qadiri order to spread far beyond the region of Baghdad.

By the end of the fifteenth century, the Qadiriyya had distinct branches and had spread to Morocco, Spain, Turkey, India, Ethiopia, Somalia, and present-day Mali. Established Sufi sheikhs often adopted the Qadiriyya tradition without abandoning leadership of their local communities. During the Safavid dynasty's rule of Baghdad from 1508 to 1534, the sheikh of the Qadiriyya was appointed chief Sufi of Baghdad and the surrounding lands. Shortly after the Ottoman Empire conquered Baghdad in 1534, Suleiman the Magnificent commissioned a dome to be built on the mausoleum of Abdul-Qadir Gilani, establishing the Qadiriyya as his main allies in Iraq.

Khawaja Abdul-Allah, a sheikh of the Qadiriyya and a descendant of the Islamic prophet Muhammad, is reported to have entered China in 1674 and traveled the country preaching until his death in 1689. One of Abdul-Allah's students, Qi Jingyi Hilal al-Din, is said to have permanently rooted Qadiri Sufism in China. He was buried in Linxia City, which became the center of the Qadiriyya in China. By the seventeenth century the Qadiriyya had also reached Ottoman-occupied areas of Europe.

Sultan Bahu contributed to the spread of Qadiriyya in western India. His method of spreading the teachings of the Sufi doctrine of Faqr was through his Punjabi couplets and other writings, which numbered more than 140. He granted the method of dhikr and stressed that the way to reach divinity was not through asceticism or excessive or lengthy prayers but through selfless love carved out of annihilation in God, which he called fana.

Sheikh Sidi Ahmad al-Bakka'i ( of the Kunta family, born in the region of the Noun river, d.1504 in Akka) established a Qadiri zawiya (Sufi residence) in Walata. In the sixteenth century the family spread across the Sahara to Timbuktu, Agades, Bornu, Hausaland, and other places, and in the eighteenth century large numbers of Kunta moved to the region of the middle Niger where they established the village of Mabruk. Sidi Al-Mukhtar al-Kunti (1728–1811) united the Kunta factions by successful negotiation, and established an extensive confederation. Under his influence the Maliki school of Islamic law was reinvigorated and the Qadiriyyah order spread throughout Mauritania, the middle Niger region, Guinea, the Ivory Coast, Futa Toro, and Futa Jallon. Kunta colonies in the Senegambian region became centers of Muslim teaching.

Sheikh Usman dan Fodio (1754-1817) from Gobir popularized the Qadiri teachings in Nigeria. He was well educated in classical Islamic science, philosophy, and theology. He also became a revered religious thinker. In 1789 a vision led him to believe he had the power to work miracles, and to teach his own mystical wird, or litany. His litanies are still widely practiced and distributed in the Islamic world. Dan Fodio later had visions of Abdul Qadir Gilani, the founder of the Qadiri tariqah, an ascension to heaven, where he was initiated into the Qadiriyya and the spiritual lineage of Muhammad. His theological writings dealt with concepts of the mujaddid "renewer" and the role of the Ulama in teaching history, and other works in Arabic and the Fula language.

Features

 Qadiri leadership is not centralised. Each centre of Qadiri thought is free to adopt its own interpretations and practices.
 The symbol of the order is the rose. A rose of green and white cloth, with a six-pointed star in the middle, is traditionally worn in the cap of Qadiri dervishes. Robes of black felt are also customary.
 Names of God are prescribed as chants for repetition by initiates (dhikr). Formerly, several hundred thousand repetitions were required, and obligatory for those who hold the office of sheikh.
Any man over the age of eighteen may be initiated. They may be asked to live in the order's commune (khanqah or tekke) and to recount their dreams to their sheikh.
 Celibacy, poverty, meditation, and mysticism within an ascetic context along with worship centered on saint's tombs were promoted by the Qadiriyya among the Hui in China. In China, unlike other Muslim sects, the leaders (Shaikhs) of the Qadiriyya Sufi order are celibate. Unlike other Sufi orders in China, the leadership within the order is not a hereditary position; rather, one of the disciples of the celibate Shaikh is chosen by the Shaikh to succeed him. The 92-year-old celibate Shaikh Yang Shijun was the leader of the Qadiriya order in China as of 1998.

Spiritual chain

The Spiritual Chain (Silsila) is listed as follows:

 1st Version of Spiritual Chain (Silsila)

 Muhammad
 Ali ibn Abi Talib
 Hasan ibn Ali
 Husayn ibn Ali
 Zayn al-Abidin
 Muhammad al-Baqir
 Ja'far al-Sadiq
 Musa al-Kazim
 Ali ar-Rida
 Maruf Karkhi
 Sirri Saqti
 Junayd al-Baghdadi
 Abu Bakr Shibli
 Abdul Aziz bin Hars bin Asad Yemeni Tamimi
 Abu Al Fazal Abdul Wahid Yemeni Tamimi
 Mohammad Yousaf Abu al-Farah Tartusi
 Abu al-Hasan Hankari
 Abu Sa'id al-Mubarak Makhzoomi
 Abdul-Qadir Gilani

 2nd Version of Spiritual Chain (Silsila), Known as Silsila Aaliyah Qadriyah 

 Muhammad
 Ali ibn Abi Talib
 Husayn ibn Ali
 Zayn al-Abidin
 Muhammad al-Baqir
 Ja'far al-Sadiq
 Musa al-Kazim
 Ali ar-Rida
 Maruf Karkhi
 Sirri Saqti
 Junayd al-Baghdadi
 Abu Bakr Shibli
 Abu Al Fazal Abdul Wahid Yemeni Tamimi
 Mohammad Yousaf Abu al-Farah Tartusi
 Abu al-Hasan Hankari
 Abu Sa'id al-Mubarak Makhzoomi
 Abdul-Qadir Gilani

 3rd Version of Spiritual Chain (Silsila)

 Muhammad
 Ali ibn Abi Talib
 Hasan Basri
 Habib al-Ajami
 Dawud Tai
 Maruf Karkhi
 Sirri Saqti
 Junayd al-Baghdadi
 Abu Bakr Shibli
 Abdul Aziz bin Hars bin Asad Yemeni Tamimi
 Abu Al Fazal Abdul Wahid Yemeni Tamimi
 Mohammad Yousaf Abu al-Farah Tartusi
 Abu al-Hasan Hankari
 Abu Sa'id al-Mubarak Makhzoomi
 Abdul-Qadir Gilani

Offshoots

Qadiri Naqshbandiyya 
The Hazrat Ishaans and their followers the Naqshbandis substantiate their leadership as rightful successors of Prophet Muhammad on the occasion of a certain biological line of prediction from Muhammad over leading Saints, so called Ghaus or Aqtab reaching Sayyid Mir Jan as the promised Khwaja-e-Khwajagan-Jahan, meaning "Khwaja of all Khwajas of the world". This line is also considered the line of the Qadiri Imamate. They all are descending from each other.

 Muhammad predicted the coming of his descendant the Muhammad al-Baqir al Hasani wal Husseini
 Muhammad Baqir predicted the coming of his descendant Ali, the Ridha men Ahlul bayt
 Ali al-Ridha predicted the coming of his descendant Muhammad al Mahdi, the Qaim
 Muhammad al Mahdi and his father Hasan al Askari as well as his little brother Sayyid Ali Akbar predicted the coming of Abdul Qadir, the Mohyuddin, "reviver of faith". This shows that the Imamate after Muhammad al Mahdi is continued reaching his relative Abdul Qadir Gilani.
 Abdul Qadir Gilani predicted the coming of his descendant Bahauddin, the Naqshband
 Bahauddin predicted the coming of his descendant Khawand Mahmud, the Hazrat Ishaan; Damrel highlights that the followers believe in the resurrection of Bahauddin (Persian:"Az Qabar Bar Amadah")[24] in year 1598, proclaiming the succession of his descendant Mahmud.
 Hazrat Ishaan and his family predicted the coming of Sayyid Mir Jan, the Khwaja of all Khwajas; Qasvari in a same manner describes the belief of the resurrection of Mahmud in the end of the 19th century, proclaiming Sayyid Mir Jan as successor and promised "Khwaja of all Khwajas".

Khwaja Khawand Mahmud Al Alavi, known by his followers as "Hazrat Ishaan" was directed by his Pir Ishaq Wali Dahbidi to spread the Naqshbandiyya in Mughal India. His influence mostly remained in the Kashmir valley, whereupon Baqi Billah has expanded the order in other parts of India. Mahmud is a significant Saint of the order as he is a direct blood descendant in the 7th generation of Baha-ul-din Naqshband, the founder of the order and his son in law Ala-ul-din Atar It is because of this that Mahmud claims direct spiritual connection to his ancestor Baha-u-din. Furthermore Mahmud had a significant amount of nobles as disciples, highlighting his popular influence in the Mughal Empire. His main emphasis was to highlight orthodox Sunni teachings. Mahmud´s son Moinuddin lies buried in their Khanqah together with his wife who was the daughter of a Mughal Emperor. It is a pilgrimage site in which congregational prayers, known as "Khoja-Digar" are held in honor of Baha-ul-Din on his death anniversary the 3rd Rabi ul Awwal of the islamic lunar calendar. This practice including the "Khatm Muazzamt" is a practice that goes back to Mahmud and his son Moinuddin The Kashmiri population venerate Mahmud and his family as they are regarded them as the revivers of the Naqshbandiyya in Kashmir.Mahmud was succeeded by his son Moinuddin and their progeny until the line died out in the eighteenth century. However this line was revived again by a descendant of Mahmud in the 8th generation called Sayyid Mir Jan Kabuli, who centered Mahmud´s cult in Lahore. Sayyid Mir Jan is buried next to Mahmud in his mausoleum in Lahore.

The current Imam of the Qadiri-Naqshbandiyya regarded as rightful successor of Abdul Qadir Gilani is His Serene Highness Prince Sayyid Raphael Dakik, who acts as the leader of the Royal Afghan Opposition. His Serene Highness is a genetical descendant of his ancestor Abdul Qadir Gilani through the above mentioned line. He highlights that there is no difference between the Naqshbandiyya and the Qadiriyya and that the Naqshbandiyya is the continuation of the Qadiriyya through the rightful successor of Abdul Qadir Gilani, Bahauddin Naqshband.

Halisa – Halisiyya
The Halisa offshoot was founded by Abdurrahman Halis Talabani (12121275 Hijra) in Kerkuk, Iraq. Hungry and miserable people were fed all day in his Tekke without regard for religion. Dawlati Osmaniyya donated money and gifts to his Tekke in Kerkuk. Sultan Abdul-Majid Khan's (Khalife of İslam, Sultan of Ottoman Empire) wife Sultana Hatun sent many gifts and donations to his Tekke as a follower. Among his followers were many leaders, rulers, and military and government officials. It was known to everyone that he lived in complete conviction. Because of the example Talibani set as a religious figure, the people's ties to him were solid and strong.

After his death, his branch was populated in Turkey, and he was followed by Dede Osman Avni Baba, Sheikh Al-Haj Ömer Hüdai Baba, Sheikh Al-Haj Muhammed Baba, Sheikh Al-Haj Mustafa Hayri Baba, Sheikh Al-Haj Haydar Baba Trabzoni and Sheikh Al-Haj Mehmet Baba.

Qadri Noshahi
The Qadri Noshahi silsila (offshoot) was established by Syed Muhammad Naushah Ganj Bakhsh of Gujrat, Punjab, Pakistan, in the late sixteenth century.

Sarwari Qadiri

Also known as Qadiriya Sultaniya, the order was started by Sultan Bahu in the seventeenth century and spread in the western part of Indian subcontinent. Hence, it follows most of the Qadiriyya approach. In contrast, it does not follow a specific dress code or require seclusion or other lengthy exercises. Its mainstream philosophy is contemplation of belovedness towards God.

The Qadiriyya–Mukhtariyya Brotherhood
This branch of the Qadiriyya came into being in the eighteenth century resulting from a revivalist movement led by Al-Mukhtar al-Kunti, a Sufi of the western Sahara who wished to establish Qadiri Sufism as the dominant religion in the region. In contrast to other branches of the Qadiriyya that do not have a centralized authority, the Mukhtariyya brotherhood was highly centralized. Its leaders focused on economic prosperity as well as spiritual well-being, sending their disciples on trade caravans as far away as Europe.

The Qadiriyya Harariya
The founder of the Qadiriyya Harariya tariqa was the Hadhrami sharif, Abu Bakr bin 'Abd Allah 'Aydarus and his shrine is located in Harar City, Ethiopia. Other notable sheikhs have shrines scattered around the environs of Harar itself. The current shaykh is a Somali named Mohamed Nasrudin bin Shaykh Ibrahim Kulmiye. The tariqa spread in Djibouti, Somaliland, Ethiopia, and Somalia. Notable Harariya Qadiriyya leaders include, Uways Al-Barawi, Sheikh Madar, Al-Zaylaʽi and Abadir Umar ar-Rida.

Qadriyah Barkaatiyah 
Founded by Sayyad Shah Barkatullah Marehrwi, (26th Jumada al-Thani 1070 AH  or  June 1660 CE – tenth Muharram 1142 AH or October 1729 CE), was an Islamic scholar, jurist,  Sufi, at the time of Mughal Emperor Aurangzeb, Shah Also founded Khanqah E Barakatiyah, Marehra Shareef, of Etah district in the state of Uttar Pradesh, India. Sayyad Shah Barkatullah Marehrwi died on tenth Muharram 1142 AH or October 1729 CE and He is buried in Dargah E Barakatiyah in Marehra Shareef,  Syed Muhammad Ameen Mian Qadri is the present custodian (Sajjada Nashin) of the Khanqah E Barakatiyah.

Qadriyah Barkaatiyah Razviyah 
Silsila E Qadriyah Barkaatiyah Razviyah was founded by Ahle Sunnat leader Imam Ahmad Raza Khan Qadri Barkaati along with Khanqah E Razviyah, When Ahmed Raza became the Mureed (disciple) of Shah Aale Rasool Marehrawi, who is descendant (great - great-grandson) of Sayyad Shah Barkatullah Marehrwi in  year 1294 AH (1877 CE), When Khan became Mureed at the same time his Murshid bestowed him with Khilafat in the several Sufi Silsilas

Qadriyah Barkaatiyah Razviyah Nooriyah 
Founded by  Mustafa Raza Khan Qadri Barkaati Noori (1892–1981), He is the younger son Imam Ahmad Raza Khan Qadri Barkaati, an Indian Muslim scholar, jurist, poet, author, leader of the Sunni Barelvi movement and Grand Mufti of India of his time, He is  Mureed (disciple) and Khalifa of Abul Hussain Ahmad Noori  Marehrawi, who is descendant (great - great - great-grandson) of Sayyad Shah Barkatullah Marehrwi, He got Khilafat and I'jaazat of Silsila Qadriyah Barkaatiyah from his Murshid along with Silsila E Chishti, Naqshbandi, Suharwardi, and Madaari.

Ansari Qadiri Rifai Tariqa

Muhammad Ansari was a descendant of both Abdul Qadir Geylani and Ahmed er Rifai and a shaykh of the Rifai Tariqa. He moved to Erzincan in northeastern Turkey in the early 1900s, where he met Shaykh Abdullah Hashimi of the Qadiri order. After working together for many years, Hashimi sent  Ansari to Istanbul to establish the Qadiri Rifai Tariqa and revive the Ayni Ali Baba Tekke. With permission from Sultan Abdul Hamid II, Ansari and his wife rebuilt the tekke and headed the Qadiri Rifai Tariqa there from 1915 until his death.

Ansari was succeeded by his son Muhyiddin Ansari, who started a tariqa in his own name called the Tariqat-i Ansariya or Ansari Tariqa. Before Muhyiddin died, he appointed Shaykh Taner Vargonen Tarsusi to establish the order in the United States. Today the Sufi Order is known as the Ansari Qadiri Rifai Tariqa, and the living leader is still Tarsusi, who has gone one to established centers of the order in several countries.

Hindiler Tekkesi Tariqa 
It was founded in 1738 by the Indian Muslim Sheykh Seyfullah Efendi El Hindi in Selamsız, and became the Romani people in Turkey Tariqa.

See also 

Sufi orders
Abdul Qadir Gilani founder
Harar hub of Qadiriyya in East Africa

Notes

References

Further reading
 Abun-Nasr, Jamil M. "The Special Sufi Paths (Taqiras)", in Muslim Communities of Grace: The Sufi Brotherhoods in Islamic Religious Life. New York: Columbia UP, 2007. 86–96.
 Chopra, R. M., Sufism, 2016, Anuradha Prakashan, New Delhi 
 "Halisa and the Distinguished Ones", Mehmet Albayrak, Ankara, 1993, Turkey

 
Sunni Sufi orders